Kryptopterus geminus is a species of catfish belonging to the family Siluridae. It can be distinguished from all its congeners, with the exception of Kryptopterus cryptopterus, by the almost flat dorsal profile with no concavity behind the head.  This species grows to a length of  SL.

Examples of this distinctively shaped, translucent fish used to be assigned to the long-established species K. cryptopterus but recent studies have shown several small but consistent differences which prompted the erection of this new species. It has been recorded in Cambodia, Laos, Thailand and Vietnam. K. geminus can be distinguished from this close relative by its narrower head, longer snout, longer anal fin and eyes located much more laterally.

References 

Siluridae
Catfish of Asia
Fish of the Mekong Basin
Fish of Cambodia
Fish of Laos
Fish of Thailand
Fish of Vietnam
Fish described in 2003